Jan-Erik Enestam (born 12 March 1947 in Västanfjärd) is a Finland-Swedish politician from the Swedish People's Party. He has a degree from the Åbo Akademi University in Turku.

Enestam was the Municipal Director of Västanfjärd between 1978 and 1983 and a Project Chief at the Nordic Council of Ministers during the period 1983–1991. He was a member of Finland's parliament, the Eduskunta, from 1991 until 2007 and a member of the government between 1995 and 2006 in various posts.

He led the Swedish People's Party from 1998 until 2006. He was succeeded by Stefan Wallin as leader at the beginning of 2007.

Career

Some previous posts he has held are:
Government of Åland, Head of Office, 1974–1978
Municipality of Västanfjärd, Municipal Manager, 1978–1983
Nordic Council of Ministers, Project Manager for Archipelago Cooperation, 1983–1991
Municipal Council of Västänfjärd, Chairperson, 1989–1996
Special Adviser to the Minister of Defence, 1990–1991
Member of Parliament, 1991 onwards
Minister of Defence, from 2 January 1995 to 13 April 1995
Minister at the Ministry of Social Affairs and Health (equality affairs),  from 2 January 1995 to 13 April 1995
Minister of the Interior, from 13 April 1995 to 15 April 1999
Party leader of the Swedish People's Party, 1998–2006
Minister of Defence, from 15 April 1999 to 17 April 2003
Minister at the Ministry for Foreign Affairs (Nordic cooperation and cooperation with the neighbouring regions), from 15 April 1999 to 17 April 2003
Minister of Environment from 17 April 2003 to 1 January 2007
Director of the Secretariat of the Nordic council from 1 August 2007 – 2013

Personal life
He was married to Solveig V. Dahlqvist in 1979 and has three children.

References

External links 
 Nordic Council

1947 births
Living people
People from Kimitoön
Swedish People's Party of Finland politicians
Ministers of Defence of Finland
Ministers of the Interior of Finland
Minister of the Environment of Finland
Members of the Parliament of Finland (1991–95)
Members of the Parliament of Finland (1995–99)
Members of the Parliament of Finland (1999–2003)
Members of the Parliament of Finland (2003–07)
Åbo Akademi University alumni